Phosphatidylinositol-3,4,5-trisphosphate-dependent Rac exchange factor 2 is a protein that in humans is encoded by the PREX2 gene.

Clinical relevance 

Mutations in this gene have been recurrently seen in melanoma.

References

Further reading